Néstor Eduardo Canelón Gil (born 19 August 1991) is a Venezuelan footballer who plays for Deportes Recoleta as a winger.

Career

As a teenager, Canelón switched from baseball to football, scoring 7 goals in his 1st game.

In 2013, he signed for Venezuelan top flight side Deportivo La Guaira after failing to make an appearance for Caracas, Venezuela's most successful club, but suffered an injury.

In 2017, he returned to Caracas.

In 2019, Canelón signed for Santiago Wanderers in Chile.

In 2022, after a brief step with Universidad Central in Venezuela, he returned to Chile and joined Deportes Recoleta.

References

External links
 Néstor Canelón at playmakerstats.com (English version of ceroacero.es)

1991 births
Living people
Footballers from Caracas
Venezuelan footballers
Venezuelan expatriate footballers
Association football wingers
Association football forwards
Association football midfielders
Caracas FC players
Deportivo La Guaira players
Deportivo Miranda F.C. players
Deportivo Anzoátegui players
Santiago Wanderers footballers
Deportes Recoleta footballers
Venezuelan Primera División players
Primera B de Chile players
Chilean Primera División players
Expatriate footballers in Chile
Venezuelan expatriate sportspeople in Chile
21st-century Venezuelan people